"Hasta Ayer" (English: Until Yesterday) is a written by Manny Delgado and performed by Venezuelan band Los Terricolas on their 1979 studio album of the same name. It was later covered by Puerto Rican-American singer-songwriter Marc Anthony on his second studio album Todo a Su Tiempo (1995). On the review of the album, Achy Obejas of The Chicago Tribune called an " oldie but goodie totally transformed by soulful crooning.". A music video for Marc Anthony's version was filmed in Mexico City and directed by Benny Corral. At the 1997 Lo Nuestro Awards, it was nominated Tropical Song of the Year. It was recognized as the best-performing songs of the year at the 1997 ASCAP Latin Awards in tropical field.

Charts

Weekly charts

Year-end charts

See also
List of Billboard Tropical Airplay number ones of 1996

References

1979 songs
1996 singles
Los Terricolas songs
Marc Anthony songs
1970s ballads
RMM Records singles
Spanish-language songs
Song recordings produced by Sergio George